Machakos County is one of the 47 counties of Kenya, which came into being because of the devolved system of governance occasioned by the 2010 constitution of Kenya. The country's first administrative headquarters are in Machakos Town, which is the largest town in the county. The county had a population of 1,421,932 as of 2019. The county borders Nairobi and Kiambu counties to the west, Embu to the north, Kitui to the east, Makueni to the south, Kajiado to the south west, and Muranga and Kirinyaga to the north west.

Government

The Machakos County Government is composed of two arms, the County Executive and the County Assembly. County Executive is headed by a Governor. The office of the Governor of Machakos was created on 27 March 2013. Alfred Mutua, served as the inaugural holder of the office. following his election in  2012. He was re-elected in the 2017 general elections. The Machakos County Assembly is headed by a Speaker elected by its members. The incumbent Speaker is Mrs. Florence Mwangangi.

Hon Wavinya Ndeti was in 2022 elected as the second governor of Machakos County, becoming the first female governor in the county and also among the 8 female governors that were historically elected in the 2022 elections, an historic rise from the 3 that were elected in the 2017 elections.
Deputy Governor- Mwangangi

Education
There are many primary schools in Machakos County, including Machakos Primary School, Kathiini primary School and Machakos Academy.

Machakos County has giant secondary schools such as Machakos School (boys), Machakos Girls' School, Mumbuni Boys' Secondary School, Mumbuni Girls' Secondary School, Masii Boys' Secondary School, Tala Girls' School, Matungulu Girls' High School, Mwala School,ST. Teresa Mwala Girls, Kitulu Day Secondary School and Kabaa High School (boys), which boasts of a castle which was left behind by Christian missionaries. This castle is now a museum.

Kwanthanze Secondary School, which is also found in Machakos County, is famous for its volleyball championship in the country.

Universities and colleges within Machakos County include Machakos University, Scott Christian University, South Eastern Kenya University (SEKU), St. Paul's University, Kenya Institute of Management,African Training Center for Research and Technology, Century Park College, Machakos Institute of Technology,Kenya Medical Training College (KMTC) Machakos campus and Machakos Technical Training Institute for the Blind.

Climate
The local climate is semi-arid with hilly terrain and an altitude of 1000 to 2100 metres above sea level.

Tourist-related activities include camping, hiking safaris, ecotourism and cultural tourism, dance and music festivals.

Economy
Subsistence agriculture is mostly practiced with maize and drought-resistant crops such as sorghum and millet being grown due to the area's semi-arid state. The county also plays host to the open air market concept with major market days where large amounts of produce are traded. Fruits, vegetables and other food stuffs like maize and beans are sold in these markets.

Future
The county is banking on projects such as the Konza Technology City, a new Machakos City and its proximity to Nairobi County to boost output in the economy.

Services
 Source: USAid Kenya

Subdivisions

The county has eight constituencies:
Masinga Constituency
Yatta Constituency
Kangundo Constituency
Matungulu Constituency
Kathiani Constituency
Mavoko Constituency
Machakos Town Constituency
Mwala Constituency

Nairobi Metro

Machakos County is within Greater Nairobi which consists of 4 out of 47 counties in Kenya, but the area generates about 60% of the nation's wealth. The counties are:
 Source: NairobiMetro/ Kenya Census

Statistics

Nairobi Metro

Urbanisation
 Source: OpenDataKenya

Wealth/poverty Level
 Source: OpenDataKenya Worldbank

South Eastern Kenya Region

Urbanisation
 Source: OpenDataKenya

Wealth/poverty Level
 Source: OpenDataKenya Worldbank

See also
Kitui County
Makueni County
Embu County
Kirinyaga County
Muranga County
Machakos County Governor

References

External links
Office for the Coordination of Humanitarian Affairs – Kenya AdminLevels 1-4

 
Counties of Kenya
Eastern Province (Kenya)